Pleasant Mills is an unincorporated community in St. Marys Township, Adams County, in the U.S. state of Indiana.

History
A post office was established at Pleasant Mills in 1850.  Edward G. Coxen was named the Pleasant Mills Postmaster on January 16, 1850. It was named from its tranquil setting near a gristmill.

Geography

Demographics

Pleasant Mills appeared as a separately-returned community in the U.S. Census twice, both times in the nineteenth century. Its highest officially-recorded population was 80 inhabitants in 1870.

References

Unincorporated communities in Adams County, Indiana
Unincorporated communities in Indiana